Semaphorin-4B is a protein that in humans is encoded by the SEMA4B gene.

References

Further reading